Heroic is a Norwegian esports organization with teams competing in Counter-Strike: Global Offensive, PlayerUnknown's Battlegrounds, Sim racing and Rainbow Six Siege. 

The esports organization is best known for its Global Offensive team, which is currently ranked in the top 1 globally and has made it to the playoffs of PGL Major Stockholm 2021 and PGL Major Antwerp 2022. They also placed 2nd in the Grand Finals of the Valve IEM Rio Major 2022

Counter-Strike: Global Offensive

Current roster

History

The organization was founded in Denmark on 26 August 2016 by with the initial roster being composed of future Astralis in-game leader Lukas "gla1ve" Rossander, Michael "Friis" Jørgensen, Valdemar "valde" Vangså, Marco "Snappi" Pfeiffer, and Andreas "MODDII" Fridh. They became a part of RFRSH Entertainment before being sold to Seranades Global in 2018. In February 2021, Heroic was acquired by Norwegian organization Omaken Sports.

On 11 April 2022, Heroic won ESL Pro League Season 13 and qualified for the BLAST Premier World Final 2021 after Casper "cadiaN" Møller won a one-versus-four against Gambit Esports in the grand finals of the tournament. Shortly after, the team announced that it had purchased a member team spot in BLAST Premier. The team is also partnered with tournament organizer ESL, with a guaranteed spot in the ESL Pro League.

At the PGL Major Antwerp 2022, Heroic made it to the quarterfinals before losing to Natus Vincere.

At the IEM Rio Major 2022, Heroic reached to the finals, but lost to Outsiders.

Achievements 
1st – DreamHack Open Atlanta 2019
1st – ESL One Cologne 2020 Europe
1st – ESL Pro League Season 13-qualified for Blast Premier World Finals 2021
3rd/4th – PGL Major Stockholm 2021
3rd/4th – Intel Extreme Masters XVI Katowice
1st – Pinnacle Winter Series 3
1st – PGL Major Antwerp 2022 Europe RMR A
5-8th – PGL Major Antwerp 2022
2nd – IEM Rio Major 2022

Rainbow Six Siege

Current roster

PlayerUnknown's Battlegrounds 
The Heroic PUBG division was formed on 5 March 2021. Heroic is ranked 2nd in the world in PUBG as of 20 May 2022.

Current roster 

Achievements
3rd – PSL Spring Showdown 2022
2nd – PUBG Global Championship 2021
2nd – PSL Elisa Esports PUBG Winter Challenge
1st – PUBG Masters 2021 Europe Spring

References

External links 
 

Counter-Strike teams
Esports teams established in 2016
Rocket League teams
Super Smash Bros. player sponsors
Tom Clancy's Rainbow Six Siege teams